59th edition of the tournament. Kuwait SC are the defending champions.

Teams

Main league table
The main league, consisting of 15 teams, was played between 15 October, 2020 and 26 December, 2020 to determine the clubs competing in the league and relegating to the second division.

League table

Statistics

Top scorers

References

External links
 
Kuwait League Fixtures and Results at FIFA
 

Kuwait Premier League seasons
Premier League
Kuwaiti Premier League